Alexis Gizaro Muvuni is a politician from the Democratic Republic of the Congo. He is Minister of Infrastructure and Public Works in the Lukonde cabinet.

References 

Year of birth missing (living people)
Living people
21st-century Democratic Republic of the Congo politicians
Government ministers of the Democratic Republic of the Congo

Infrastructure ministers of the Democratic Republic of the Congo